Mickaël Marsiglia (born 25 December 1975, in La Ciotat) is a former French football midfielder who is now working as the assistant manager for AS Cannes.

Career
Marsiglia began his career with AS Cannes. In 2000, he was subject of a £1.75 million move to Olympique de Marseille, to replace Robert Pires.

In September 2004, Marsiglia signed a four-month contract with Scottish First Division side Clyde. However, he never really adjusted to the Scottish game, and left the club after only one month, in which he played three games.

He then went on to have spells in Switzerland, Israel and Italy, before returning to AS Cannes in 2008 for a third spell with the French outfit.

Managerial Career
Marsiglia joined as Manager of AS Cannes in 2016 before moving to a preferred role of Assistant Manager of Cannes in 2017, and still serves as assistant manager to this day.

See also
Clyde F.C. season 2004-05

References

External links

1975 births
Living people
Association football midfielders
French footballers
AS Cannes players
RC Strasbourg Alsace players
Olympique de Marseille players
Racing de Ferrol footballers
FC Cartagena footballers
Clyde F.C. players
Yverdon-Sport FC players
Hapoel Petah Tikva F.C. players
Scottish Football League players
French expatriate footballers
Expatriate footballers in Israel
Expatriate footballers in Italy
Expatriate footballers in Spain
Expatriate footballers in Scotland
Expatriate footballers in Switzerland
Ligue 1 players
People from La Ciotat
Sportspeople from Bouches-du-Rhône
French expatriate sportspeople in Israel
French expatriate sportspeople in Italy
French expatriate sportspeople in Spain
French expatriate sportspeople in Scotland
French expatriate sportspeople in Switzerland
U.S. Imperia 1923 players
Footballers from Provence-Alpes-Côte d'Azur